The 1932 United States presidential election in Pennsylvania took place on November 8, 1932 as part of the 1932 United States presidential election. Voters chose 36 representatives, or electors to the Electoral College, who voted for president and vice president.

Pennsylvania voted for the Republican nominee, President Herbert Hoover, over the Democratic nominee, New York Governor Franklin D. Roosevelt. Hoover won Pennsylvania by a margin of 5.51%. With 50.84% of the popular vote, Pennsylvania would be Hoover's third strongest state in the nation after Vermont and Maine. 

This is the last election where the Republican candidate carried Philadelphia County in a presidential election. 1932 was the third most recent election in which Pennsylvania did not vote the same as neighboring New York, a phenomenon that has only been repeated twice since, in 1988 and 2016. It is also the third most recent election where Pennsylvania voted for a different candidate than neighboring Michigan, another phenomenon that has only been repeated twice since, in 1940 and 1976. Until 2016, this was the last time that the state voted Republican and neighboring New Jersey voted Democratic.

Results

Results by county

See also
 List of United States presidential elections in Pennsylvania

References

Pennsylvania
1932
1932 Pennsylvania elections